Lyle Eldon Stewart is a Canadian provincial politician. He is a current Saskatchewan Party member of the Legislative Assembly of Saskatchewan.

Stewart has been involved in politics since the 1970's. He served as the executive assistant to disgraced Minister Colin Thatcher, before Thatcher resigned and was convicted of first degree murder, for beating and shooting his ex-wife JoAnne Wilson. Later Stewart served as the MLA for Thunder Creek and a former Liberal who had crossed the floor to the Progressive Conservatives prior to that party winning power in the 1982 election. After Thatcher was imprisoned for the 1983 murder of his wife Stewart twice sought the PC nomination, first for the ensuing by-election in 1985 and again for the 1986 general election. On both occasions, he was defeated by Rick Swenson.

After the riding switched back to the Liberals following the 1995 election, Stewart joined the new Saskatchewan Party which had essentially replaced the scandal-ridden PC's as the largest centre-right party in the province. This time, he defeated Swenson for the nomination. Stewart then unseated incumbent Liberal Gerard Aldridge in the 1999 general election. Stewart represented the constituency of Thunder Creek until its abolition in 2016. Stewart was subsequently elected in Lumsden-Morse, a new electoral district encompassing most of the former Thunder Creek constituency.

Stewart has been the Minister of Agriculture and the Minister Responsible for Saskatchewan Crop Insurance Corporation since May 25, 2012, a role he maintained following the August 23, 2016 cabinet shuffle. He has been a member of the Executive Council of Saskatchewan since 2007, previously serving as the Minister for Enterprise and Innovation. On August 9, 2018, he announced he was resigning from Cabinet due to health concerns. In late 2020 Stewart was named Legislative Secretary to the Premier responsible for Provincial Autonomy and also the role of Provincial secretary.

Stewart caused controversy in October 2022 when his mentor Colin Thatcher, currently serving a life sentence for first degree murder, attended the Speech from the Throne, while on parole. Stewart later acknowledged in a statement that he had invited Thatcher, whom he called a "friend," and that the invitation was an "error in judgment."

On March 6, 2023, Stewart announced his resignation from the legislative assembly effective March 10, citing health reasons.

Electoral record

|-

|Larry Hall
|align="right"|1,997
|align="right"|23.16%
|align="right"|-7.65

 
|Richard Swenson
|align="right"|295
|align="right"|3.42%
|align="right"|-

|- bgcolor="white"
!align="left" colspan=3|Total
!align="right"|8,624
!align="right"|100.00%
!align="right"|

|-

|Ivan Costley
|align="right"|1,496
|align="right"|19.96%
|align="right"|-10.90
|- bgcolor="white"
!align="left" colspan=3|Total
!align="right"|7,496
!align="right"|100.00%
!align="right"|

Cabinet positions

References

Living people
1951 births
Members of the Executive Council of Saskatchewan
Saskatchewan Party MLAs
21st-century Canadian politicians
Canadian ranchers
Farmers from Saskatchewan